"Oxygen" is a song by British new rave band Hadouken!. It was released as the second single from their third studio album Every Weekend on 7 November 2010. The EP was released later on 18 January 2011.

Background
"Oxygen" is the second of two songs (the other being "Mecha Love") that the band had confirmed to be released as singles in 2010, before the rest of their third album is recorded in January 2011.

The song was mistakenly released on Beatport on the same date as "Mecha Love", several weeks before the announced release date. To compensate for this, the official release date was pushed back into December and the release was extended into an EP.

Music video
The music video was first published through Hadouken!'s YouTube channel on 8 January 2011. It features scenes of a woman in a bath tub attached to wires while the band is performing the song. An alternate video for the song was also released on 27 January.

Track listing

Chart positions

References

Hadouken! songs
2010 singles
2010 songs
EMI Records singles